The Promise was the second studio album released by R&B duo Fly to the Sky. Like the debut album, the album included poppy ballads and upbeat dance tracks. Hits from this album includes "The Promise" and "Maybe God Knows." As a bonus track, the remix of "The Promise" is also included in the album. The album peaked at #2, selling more than 200,000 copies in its first month of release. However, it quickly slipped off the charts, falling less than 4,000 copies short of surpassing the chart performance of the duo's debut album. The album features vocal collaboration by Kangta and BoA and songs written by R&B singer Kim Jo-Han.

Track listing
약속 (The Promise)
A Confession (고백)
What U Want
I Want (feat. Kangta and BoA)
I Want You I Need You
Retry
Always Together
Maybe God Knows
In Your Eyes
Crystal (Featuring Jinju)
Don't Forget Me
Shy Love
Baby Love
Should I Stay...
약속 (CD Bonus Track, Booty Mix)

Chart performance

References

2001 albums
Fly to the Sky albums
SM Entertainment albums